Central Reserve Police Force Sporting Club is an Indian football club based in Jalandhar, Punjab, which currently competes in the Punjab State Super Football League. The team participated in both the second division of the National Football League in 2003, and the Durand Cup in 2012 and 2021.

References

Football clubs in Punjab, India
Sport in Jalandhar
Organizations with year of establishment missing